The Volksbühne ("People's Theatre") is a theater in Berlin. Located in Berlin's city center Mitte on Rosa-Luxemburg-Platz (Rosa Luxemburg Square) in what was the GDR's capital. It has been called Berlin's most iconic theatre.

About 
The Volksbühne was built during the years 1913 to 1914 and was designed by Oskar Kaufmann, with integrated sculpture by Franz Metzner. It opened on December 30, 1914 and has its origin in an organization known as the "Freie Volksbühne" ("Free People's Theater") founded in 1890 by Bruno Wille and Wilhelm Bölsche, which sketched out the vision for a theater "of the people" in 1892. The goal of the organization was to promote the naturalist plays of the day at prices accessible to the common worker. The original slogan inscribed on the edifice was "Die Kunst dem Volke" ("Art to the people"). During World War II, the theatre was heavily damaged like much of the rest of Berlin. From 1950 to 1954, it was rebuilt according to the design of architect Hans Richter.

Frank Castorf became director in 1992. During his 25-year tenure, through mid 2017, the theater's ambitious, experimental productions, brought it worldwide recognition as a leading European venue.

In 2015 the City of Berlin announced that Castorf would be replaced by Chris Dercon in 2017, who himself resigned in April 2018 after what was considered by many to have been a commercially and artistically weak period for the theater.

Left-wing activists occupied the theater in September 2017.

René Pollesch was appointed to be a new director from 2021.

References

External links

Official Volksbühne website

Theatres in Berlin
Buildings and structures in Berlin
Rebuilt buildings and structures in Berlin